Social comparison theory, initially proposed by social psychologist Leon Festinger in 1954, centers on the belief that there is a drive within individuals to gain accurate self-evaluations. The theory explains how individuals evaluate their own opinions and abilities by comparing themselves to others in order to reduce uncertainty in these domains, and learn how to define the self. Comparing oneself to others socially is a form of measurement and self assessment to identify where an individual stands according to their own set of standards and emotions about themselves.

Following the initial theory, research began to focus on social comparison as a way of self-enhancement, introducing the concepts of downward and upward comparisons and expanding the motivations of social comparisons. Social comparison can be traced back to the pivotal paper by Herbert Hyman, back in 1942. Hyman revealed the assessment of one’s own status is dependent on the group with whom one compares oneself. The social comparison theory is the belief that media influence, social status, and other forms of competitiveness can affect our self-esteem and mood. In turn, this can affect individuals outlook on themselves and how they fit in with others.

Leon Festinger 

Leon Festinger was an American psychologist who developed the concept of social comparison theory. Festinger was born in New York City on May 8, 1919. Festinger had an interest in science which led him to pursue a career in psychology. He received his bachelor's degree from the City College and went on to Iowa State University for his master’s degree and Ph.D. which he received in 1942. Leon Festinger made his mark in social psychology by teaching the importance of scientific experimentation while challenging the influence of behaviorism and the affects it has.

Initial framework 
In the theory, Festinger provided nine main hypotheses:

 First, he stated that humans have a basic drive to evaluate their opinions and abilities and that people evaluate themselves through objective, nonsocial means (Hypothesis I).
 Second, Festinger stated that if objective, nonsocial means were not available, that people evaluate their opinions and abilities by comparison to other people (Hypothesis II).
 Next, he hypothesized that the tendency to compare oneself to another person decreases as the difference between their opinions and abilities becomes more divergent. In other words, if someone is much different from you, you are less likely to compare yourself to that person (Hypothesis III).
 He next hypothesized that there is a unidirectional drive upward in the case of abilities, which is largely absent in opinions. This drive refers to the value that is placed on doing better and better. (Hypothesis IV).
 Next, Festinger hypothesizes that there are non-social restraints that make it difficult or even impossible to change one's ability and these restraints are largely absent for opinions. In other words, people can change their opinions when they want to but no matter how motivated individuals may be to improve their ability, there may be other elements that make this impossible (Hypothesis V).
 Festinger goes on to hypothesize that the cessation of comparison with others is accompanied by hostility or derogation to the extent that continued comparison with those persons implies unpleasant consequences (Hypothesis VI).
 Next, any factors which increase the importance of some particular group as a comparison group from some particular opinion or ability will increase the pressure toward uniformity concerning that ability or opinion within that group. If discrepancies arise between the evaluator and comparison group there is a tendency to reduce the divergence by either attempting to persuade others, or changing their personal views to attain uniformity. However, the importance, relevance and attraction to a comparison group that affects the original motivation for comparison, mediates the pressures towards uniformity (Hypothesis VII).
 His next hypothesis states that if persons who are very divergent from one's own opinion or ability are perceived as different from oneself on attributes consistent with the divergence, the tendency to narrow the range of comparability becomes stronger (Hypothesis VIII).
 Lastly, Festinger hypothesized that when there is a range of opinion or ability in a group, the relative strength of the three manifestations of pressures toward uniformity will be different for those who are close to the mode of the group than for those who are distant from the mode. Those close to the mode will have stronger tendencies to change the positions of others, weaker tendencies to narrow the range of comparison, and even weaker tendencies to change their own opinions (Hypothesis IX).

Theoretical advances 
Since its inception, the initial framework has undergone several advances. Key among these are developments in understanding the motivations that underlie social comparisons, and the particular types of social comparisons that are made. Motives that are relevant to social comparison include self-enhancement, maintenance of a positive self-evaluation, components of attributions and validation, and the avoidance of closure. While there have been changes in Festinger's original concept, many fundamental aspects remain, including the prevalence of the tendency towards social comparison and the general process that is social comparison.

Compare and contrast self-evaluation to self-enhancement 
According to Thorton and Arrowood, self-evaluation is one of the functions of social comparison. This is one process that underlies how an individual engages in social comparison. Each individual's specific goals will influence how they engage in social comparison. For self-evaluation, people tend to choose a comparison target that is similar to themselves. Specifically, they are most interested in choosing a target who shares some distinctive characteristic with themselves. They also think that knowing the truth about themselves is salutary. Research suggests that most people believe that choosing a similar target helps ensure the accuracy of the self-evaluation. However, individuals do not always act as unbiased self-evaluators, and accurate self-evaluations may not be the primary goal of social comparison. There have been many studies and they have shown that American women tend to be dissatisfied with their looks, they either rate themselves "too plain, old, pimply, fat, hairy, tall" and so much more. Women are much more sensitive than men especially with it having to do with their physical appearance. Due to media digitally altering women's appearance from the width of their torso or arms to the softness of their complexion creates the ideal that thin and flawless is the only acceptable way to look. This leads to diet culture, excessive exercise, and had led to many eating disorders. This form of social comparison can cause harm and can affect the development of the way someone sees themselves.

Individuals may also seek self-enhancement, or to improve their self-esteem. They may interpret, distort, or ignore the information gained by social comparison to see themselves more positively and further their self-enhancement goals. People also seek self enhancement because holding favorable illusions about themselves is gratifying. They will also choose to make upward (comparing themselves to someone better off) or downward (comparing themselves to someone worse off) comparisons, depending on which strategy will further their self-enhancement goals. They may also avoid making comparisons period, or avoid making certain types of comparisons. Specifically, when an individual believes that their ability in a specific area is low, they will avoid making upward social comparisons in that area. Unlike for self-evaluation goals, people engaging in social comparison with the goal of self-enhancement may not seek out a target that is similar to themselves. In fact, if a target's similarity is seen as a threat, due to the target outperforming the individual on some dimension, the individual may downplay the similarity of the target to themselves. This notion ties closely to the phenomena in psychology introduced also by Leon Festinger himself as it relates to the diminishing of cognitive dissonance. This dissonance causes an uncomfortableness psychologically which motivates a person to remove the dissonance. The more dissonance there is creates a bigger sense of pressure to remove the dissonance and uncomfortableness caused by it. One does not want to perceive oneself in a way which would downplay one's original belief upon which one's self-esteem is based and therefore in order to reduce the cognitive dissonance, one is willing to change the cognitive representation of the other person whom one compares oneself to, such that one's own belief about oneself remains intact. This effectively leads to the comparison of apples to oranges or psychological denial.

Later advances in theory led to self-enhancement being one of the four self-evaluation motives:, along with self-assessment, self-verification, and self-improvement.

Upward and downward social comparisons
Wills introduced the concept of downward comparison in 1981. Downward social comparison is a defensive tendency that is used as a means of self-evaluation.  When a person looks to another individual or group that they consider to be worse off than themselves in order to feel better about their self or personal situation, they are making a downward social comparison. Research has suggested that social comparisons with others who are better off or superior, or upward comparisons, can lower self-regard, whereas downward comparisons can elevate self-regard. Downward comparison theory emphasizes the positive effects of comparisons in increasing one's subjective well-being. For example, it has been found that breast cancer patients made the majority of comparisons with patients less fortunate than themselves. Ashby found similar results in his experiment showing, downward comparison in people subjected to distress from a physical illness such as heart disease or cancer. They also see those who recover from the same illness, and the study found that patients tended to be more optimistic about their own recovery.

Although social comparison research has suggested that upward comparisons can lower self-regard, Collins indicates that this is not always the case. Individuals make upward comparisons, whether consciously or subconsciously, when they compare themselves with an individual or comparison group that they perceive as superior or better than themselves in order to improve their views of self or to create a more positive perception of their personal reality.  Upward social comparisons are made to self-evaluate and self-improve in the hopes that self-enhancement will also occur. In an upward social comparison, people want to believe themselves to be part of the elite or superior, and make comparisons highlighting the similarities between themselves and the comparison group, unlike a downward social comparison, where similarities between individuals or groups are disassociated.

It has also been suggested that upward comparisons may provide an inspiration to improve, and in one study it was found that while breast cancer patients made more downward comparisons, they showed a preference for information about more fortunate others.

Another study indicated that people who were dieting often used upward social comparisons by posting pictures of thinner people on their refrigerators. These pictures served as not only a reminder of an individuals current weight, but also as an inspiration of a goal to be reached. In simple terms, downward social comparisons are more likely to make us feel better about ourselves, while upward social comparisons are more likely to motivate us to achieve more or reach higher.

Moderators of social comparison
Aspinwall and Taylor looked at mood, self-esteem, and threat as moderators that drive individuals to choose to make upward or downward social comparisons. Downward comparisons in cases where individuals had experienced a threat to their self-esteem produced more favorable self-evaluations.

High self-esteem and social comparison
Aspinwall and Taylor found that upward social comparisons were good in circumstances where the individuals making the comparisons had high self-esteem, because these types of comparisons provided them with more motivation and hope than downward social comparisons. However, if these individuals had experienced a recent threat or setback to their self-esteem, they reported that upward comparisons resulted in a more negative affect than downward comparisons.

Low self-esteem and social comparison
However, people with low self-esteem or people who are experiencing some sort of threat in their life (such as doing poorly in school, or suffering from an illness) tend to favor downward comparisons over upward comparisons. People with low self-esteem and negative affect improve their mood by making downward comparisons. Their mood does not improve as much as it would if they had high self-esteem. Even for people with low self-esteem, these downward social comparisons do improve their negative mood and allow them to feel hope and motivation for their future. However, these feelings of home could deter them from succeeding due to the harshness of which they judge themselves whether it is their success or their failures. Lower self-esteem can lead an individual to have higher standards for themselves but may never achieve them due to the judgement they receive from within.

Affect/mood and its effect on social comparison
Individuals who have a negative mood improve their mood by making upward social comparisons, regardless of their level of self-esteem. In addition, both individuals with high self-esteem and low self-esteem who are in a positive mood elevate their mood further by making upward comparisons. However, for those who have recently experienced a threat to their self-esteem or a setback in their life, making upward social comparisons instead of downward social comparisons results in a more negative affect. Self-esteem and existence of a threat or setback in an individual's life are two moderators of their response to upward or downward comparisons.

Competitiveness 
Because individuals are driven upwards in the case of abilities, social comparisons can drive competition among peers. In this regard, the psychological significance of a comparison depends on the social status of an individual, and the context in which their abilities are being evaluated.

Social status 
Competitiveness resulting from social comparisons may be greater in relation to higher social status because individuals with more status have more to lose. In one study, students in a classroom were presented with a bonus point program where, based on chance, the grades for some students would increase and the grades for others would remain the same. Despite the fact that students could not lose by this program, higher-status individuals were more likely to object to the program, and more likely to report a perceived distributive injustice. It was suggested that this was a cognitive manifestation of an aversion to downward mobility, which has more psychological significance when an individual has more status.

Proximity to a standard 
When individuals are evaluated where meaningful standards exist, such as in an academic classroom where students are ranked, then competitiveness increases as proximity to a standard of performance increases. When the only meaningful standard is the top, then high-ranking individuals are most competitive with their peers, and individuals at low and intermediate ranks are equally competitive. However, when both high and low rankings hold significance, then individuals at high and low ranks are equally competitive, and are both more competitive than individuals at intermediate ranks.

Models of social comparison 
Several models have been introduced to social comparison, including the self-evaluation maintenance model (SEM), proxy model, the triadic model and the three-selves model.

Self-evaluation maintenance model 
The SEM model proposes that we make comparisons to maintain or enhance our self-evaluations, focusing on the antagonistic processes of comparison and reflection.
Abraham Tesser has conducted research on self-evaluation dynamics that has taken several forms. A self-evaluation maintenance (SEM) model of social behavior focuses on the consequences of another person's outstanding performance on one's own self-evaluation. It sketches out some conditions under which the other's good performance bolsters self-evaluation, i.e., "basking in reflected glory", and conditions under which it threatens self-evaluation through a comparison process.

Proxy model 
The proxy model anticipates the success of something that is unfamiliar.  The model proposes that if a person is successful or familiar with a task, then he or she would also be successful at a new similar task.  The proxy is evaluated based on ability and is concerned with the question "Can I do X?" A proxy's comparison is based previous attributes. The opinion of the comparer and whether the proxy exerted maximum effort on a preliminary task are variables influencing his or her opinion.

Triadic model 
The Triadic Model builds on the attribution elements of social comparison, proposing that opinions of social comparison are best considered in terms of 3 different evaluative questions: preference assessment (i.e., "Do I like X?"), belief assessment (i.e., "Is X correct?"), and preference prediction (i.e., "Will I like X?"). In the Triadic Model the most meaningful comparisons are with a person who has already experienced a proxy and exhibits consistency in related attributes or past preferences.

Three-selves model 
The three-selves model proposes that social comparison theory is a combination of two different theories. One theory is developed around motivation and the factors that influence the type of social comparison information people seek from their environment and the second is about self-evaluation and the factors that influence the effects of social comparisons on the judgments of self. While there has been much research in the area of comparison motives, there has been little in the area of comparative evaluation. Explaining that the self is conceived as interrelated conceptions accessible depending upon current judgment context and taking a cue from Social Cognitive Theory, this model examines the Assimilation effect and distinguishes three classes of working Self-concept ideas: individual selves, possible selves and collective selves.

Media influence 
The media has been found to play a large role in social comparisons. Researchers examining the social effects of the media have used social comparison theory have found that in most cases women tend to engage in upward social comparisons with a target other, which results in more negative feelings about the self. The majority of women have a daily opportunity to make upward comparison by measuring themselves against some form of societal ideal. Social comparisons have become a relevant mechanism for learning about the appearance-related social expectations among peers and for evaluating the self in terms of those standards. (Jones, 2001, P. 647).

Although men do make upward comparisons, research finds that more women make upward comparisons and are comparing themselves with unrealistically high standards presented in the media. As women are shown more mainstream media images of powerful, successful and thin women, they perceive the "ideal" to be the norm for societal views of attractive.  In recent years, social media platforms such as Facebook and Instagram have made this more widespread, since social media makes it easier to compare yourself to the "ideal". Some women have reported making upward comparisons in a positive manner for the purposes of self-motivation, but the majority of upward comparisons are made when the individual is feeling lesser and therefore evoke a negative connotation.

Self-perceived similarities with role models on social media can also affect self-esteem for both men and women. Having more self-perceived similarities with a role model can help increase self-esteem, while having less can decrease self-esteem. Social comparison with peers on social media can also lead to feelings of self-pity or satisfaction. The desire for social comparison can cause FoMO and compulsive checking of social media sites.

Criticisms 
Many criticisms arose regarding Festinger's similarity hypothesis. Deutsch and Krauss argued that people actually seek out dissimilar others in their comparisons maintaining that this is important for providing valuable self-knowledge, as demonstrated in research. Ambiguity also circulated about the important dimensions for similarity. Goethals and Darley clarified the role of similarity suggesting that people prefer to compare those who are similar on related attributes such as opinions, characteristics or abilities to increase confidence for value judgments, however those dissimilar in related attributes are preferred when validating one's beliefs.

See also
 Frog pond effect
Social projection

References

Further reading
 Miller, K. (2005). Communication theories: Perspectives, processes, and contexts. New York: McGraw Hill.

Sociological theories
Communication
Communication theory
Attitude change